Mfinu (also known as Emfinu, Funika, Mfununga, Ntsiam or Ntswar) is a Bantu language of the Democratic Republic of Congo. It is spoken by the Bamfinu tribe.

References

Teke languages
Languages of the Democratic Republic of the Congo